Stephen Williams is a Canadian film and television director. Williams has directed several modern-day television programs including work as a regular director on the ABC drama series Lost, where he was also a co-executive producer.

Life and career 
In 1995, Williams wrote and directed the film Soul Survivor, which starred his brother Peter in the main role. In 2004, he began directing on the ABC drama series Lost, and later also rose to the position of co-executive producer.

Williams is married to Jocelyn Snowdon and the couple has a daughter together, in addition to Stephen's twin sons, Gabriel and Justis. The couple now resides in the Los Angeles area. His brother is actor Peter Williams, best known for playing the Goa'uld Apophis on Stargate SG-1.

Filmography

Producer

Director

Film 
 Soul Survivor (1995); also screenwriter
 Shadow Zone: My Teacher Ate My Homework (1997)
 Milgaard (1999)
 Chevalier (2022)

Television

References

External links
 

Canadian film directors
Canadian television directors
Canadian male screenwriters
Black Canadian filmmakers
Black Canadian writers
Living people
Canadian Film Centre alumni
Year of birth missing (living people)